Hampton, Oregon may refer to:

Hampton, Deschutes County, Oregon
Hampton, Lane County, Oregon